Samuel Andrew Witherspoon (May 4, 1855 – November 24, 1915) was a U.S. Representative from Mississippi.

Biography
Born near Columbus, Mississippi, Witherspoon attended the public schools. In 1872 he moved with his mother to Oxford, Mississippi.
He graduated from the University of Mississippi at Oxford in 1876 with a degree in law. He became a professor at the University of Mississippi from 1876 to 1879.
He was admitted to the bar in 1879 and commenced practice in Meridian, Mississippi, the same year.

Witherspoon was elected as a Democrat to the Sixty-second, Sixty-third, and Sixty-fourth Congresses and served from March 4, 1911, until his death in Meridian, Mississippi, November 24, 1915.
He was interred in Rose Hill Cemetery.

See also
List of United States Congress members who died in office (1900–49)

References

Samuel Andrew Witherspoon, late a representative from Mississippi, Memorial addresses delivered in the House of Representatives and Senate frontispiece 1917

1855 births
1915 deaths
University of Mississippi alumni
University of Mississippi faculty
Democratic Party members of the United States House of Representatives from Mississippi
19th-century American politicians